USS Holmes has been the name of more than one United States Navy ship, and may refer to:

 , a patrol frigate transferred to the United Kingdom while under construction and in service in the Royal Navy as the frigate  from 1944 to 1945
 , a destroyer escort transferred to the United Kingdom which served in the Royal Navy as the frigate  from 1944 to 1945

United States Navy ship names